Abdul Rahman Anjan Umma (born 6 September 1955) is a Sri Lankan politician and teacher. In the 2004 election, she was elected from the Gampaha District to the Parliament of Sri Lanka as a United People's Freedom Alliance candidate. In June 2008, she left the party she belonged to, the Janatha Vimukthi Peramuna. After a short period as an independent MP, she joined the National Freedom Front. On 31 October 2012 she became a member of the opposition United National Party (UNP).

References

1955 births
Living people
Members of the 11th Parliament of Sri Lanka
Members of the 12th Parliament of Sri Lanka
Members of the 13th Parliament of Sri Lanka
Janatha Vimukthi Peramuna politicians
Jathika Nidahas Peramuna politicians
United People's Freedom Alliance politicians
Women legislators in Sri Lanka
21st-century Sri Lankan women politicians